Duboisvalia cononia is a moth in the Castniidae family. It is found in Ecuador, Colombia, Peru and Brazil.

Subspecies
Duboisvalia cononia cononia (Ecuador, Colombia)
Duboisvalia cononia amazonica (Strand, 1913) (Peru)
Duboisvalia cononia duckei (Fassl, 1921) (Brazil: Para, Amazonas)

References

Moths described in 1877
Castniidae